Jonathan Proietti (born 17 July 1982) is a former Luxembourgian international footballer who last played club football for FC Progrès Niederkorn, as a midfielder.

References

External links

1982 births
Living people
Luxembourgian footballers
Luxembourg international footballers
Luxembourgian people of Italian descent
Association football midfielders